Michael Schmid may refer to:

 Michael Schmid (skier) (born 1984), Swiss freestyle skier
 Michael Schmid (rower) (born 1988), Swiss rower
 Michael Schmid (politician) (born 1945), Austrian architect, politician, and former Minister of Transport
 Mike Schmid American singer/songwriter

See also
 Michael Schmidt (disambiguation)